Sandra Louise Miesel (born Sandra Louise Schwartz on November 25, 1941) is an American medievalist, writer, and science fiction and fantasy fan. Her early work was in science fiction and fantasy criticism, fields in which she has remained active.

Writing career 
Miesel was a member of science fiction fandom (a connection which sprang from a letter she had published in IF magazine), with critical articles in the science fiction fanzine Yandro, especially on Anderson and Dickson, as well as other fanzines such as Granfalloon. She was nominated for the Hugo Award for Best Fan Writer three times (1973–1975) and had two monographs published by Fannish small presses: Myth, Symbol and Religion in The Lord of the Rings (TK Graphics, 1973) and Against Time's Arrow: The High Crusade of Poul Anderson (Borgo Press, 1978).

Miesel has written hundreds of articles for the Catholic press, chiefly on history, art, and hagiography. She wrote regularly for the now-defunct Crisis Catholic magazine and is a columnist for the diocesan paper of the Diocese of Norwich, Connecticut. Miesel is also a well-known speaker. She has spoken at religious and academic conferences, appeared on EWTN, and given numerous radio interviews.

She has co-authored a book, The Da Vinci Hoax: Exposing the Errors in The Da Vinci Code, a detailed critique of the popular novel based on her knowledge of Catholic history and teachings.

She is the co-author of The Pied Piper of Atheism: Philip Pullman and Children's Fantasy with Catholic journalist and canon lawyer Pete Vere. The book, published by Ignatius Press, offers a detailed critique of Philip Pullman's His Dark Materials trilogy from a Catholic point of view.

Personal life 
She holds master's degrees in biochemistry and medieval history from the University of Illinois. Miesel lives in the Indianapolis, Indiana area, with her husband John. They were married 42 years until his death in 2006.

Selected works
 
 
   Speculative fiction.  An earlier version was published as Dreamrider (Ace Books, 1982).
 "The Fan As Critic" in Science fiction fandom Joe Sanders, ed. (Contributions to the study of science fiction and fantasy, no. 62) Westport, Conn.: Greenwood Press, 1994.

References

External links

Catholics and Science Fiction, a short interview between Miesel and Ignatius Press.

1941 births
20th-century American novelists
American fantasy writers
American literary critics
Women literary critics
American science fiction writers
American women short story writers
American women novelists
Living people
Roman Catholic writers
American women journalists
Women science fiction and fantasy writers
20th-century American women writers
20th-century American short story writers
20th-century American non-fiction writers
American medievalists
Women medievalists
21st-century American women
American women critics